Chub Lake is a lake located west of Raquette Lake, New York. Fish species present in the lake are black bullhead, and brook trout. There is trail access on the south and west shore from the north shore of Constable Pond. No motors are allowed on Chub Lake.

References

Lakes of Hamilton County, New York
Lakes of New York (state)